Valiabad (also Romanized as Valīābād) is a village in Zalu Ab Rural District, in the Central District of Ravansar County, Kermanshah Province, Iran. At the 2006 census, its population was 35, in 9 families.

References 

Populated places in Ravansar County